Daisuke Matsumoto may refer to:
 Daisuke Matsumoto (politician)
 Daisuke Matsumoto (footballer)